Pavones is an administrative neighborhood (barrio) of Madrid belonging to the district of Moratalaz. As of 1 February 2020, it has a population of 9197. The Madrid Spain Temple of the Church of Jesus Christ of Latter-day Saints is located here; it is the church's most iconic building in Spain.

References 

Wards of Madrid
Moratalaz